Boraqchin was the first and eldest wife of Ögedei Khan. They had no surviving children.

The earliest known Sino-Mongolian inscription, from 1240, mentions a "Yeke Qadun" or "Great empress". Some scholars have identified this figure with Boraqchin, while others argue that the inscription refers to Ögedei Khan's second wife, Töregene Khatun.

See also
 History of Mongolia
 Ogedei Khan

References

Genghis Khan
Women of the Mongol Empire